Venkatesh Mandir (Devasthan) is a Hindu mandir located in Gaushala, Batttisputali Kathmandu, Nepal. It resembles the Lord Tirupati Balaji of India.

Location
Venkatesh Mandir (Devasthan) is located at Gaushala in Kathmandu. It is near the holy pilgrimage Pashupatinath and Gaushala chowk.

Introduction
This temple is one of the oldest Vaishnav temples of Nepal. It is run by the help of devotees.

History
Legend states that in 1898 C.E. Vaikuntha wasi Srimati Garudhwaj Ramanuja Dasi "aafuaama" and her husband Govindacharya made a pilgrimage to Tirumala Venkateswara Temple in India, returning to Nepal with a small statue of Balaji (also known as Venkateswara, a manifestation of the Hindu Vishnu). Temple management states that other statues were also brought back from other visits.

References

Hindu temples in Kathmandu District